Heathman is an unincorporated community in Sunflower County, Mississippi, United States.

The Columbus and Greenville Railway passes through Heathman.

History
In 1900, Heathman had a money-order post office and a population of 35.

The Heathman Plantation is located within the settlement.

Notable people
Heathman is the birthplace of George Washington Lee, known as "Lieutenant Lee of Beale Street", an author and civic leader in Memphis, Tennessee.

References

Unincorporated communities in Sunflower County, Mississippi
Unincorporated communities in Mississippi